Lyle Elmer Strom (born January 6, 1925) is an inactive Senior United States district judge of the United States District Court for the District of Nebraska.

Education and career

Born in Omaha, Nebraska, Strom received a Bachelor of Arts degree from Creighton University in 1950 and a Juris Doctor from Creighton University School of Law in 1953. He was a United States Naval Reserve Ensign during World War II, from 1943 to 1946. He was in private practice in Omaha from 1953 to 1985, also serving as an adjunct professor for the Creighton University School of Law in 1958. He was a clinical professor at the Creighton University School of Law, in the Robert Spire Intern Program, from 1996 through 2005.

Federal judicial service

On September 27, 1985 Strom was nominated by President Ronald Reagan to a seat on the United States District Court for the District of Nebraska vacated by Albert Gerard Schatz. Strom was confirmed by the United States Senate on October 25, 1985 and received his commission on October 28, 1985. He served as Chief Judge from 1987 to 1994, assuming senior status on November 2, 1995. On June 6, 2017, Strom took inactive senior status in December 2017, meaning that while he remains a federal judge, he no longer hears cases or participates in the business of the court.

Observations

Strom has stated that his "vision for the law is that we restore the professionalism and civility that were its trademarks when [he] was admitted to practice… The Nebraska high school mock trial competition is now named after Strom and is referred to as the Judge Lyle Strom High School Mock Trial Championship.

Personal

In 1997 his daughter, Susan Frances Strom, died in the Heaven's Gate cult mass suicide.

References

Sources

1925 births
Living people
Lawyers from Omaha, Nebraska
Military personnel from Omaha, Nebraska
Creighton University alumni
Creighton University School of Law alumni
Creighton University faculty
Judges of the United States District Court for the District of Nebraska
United States district court judges appointed by Ronald Reagan
20th-century American judges
United States Navy officers
21st-century American judges
United States Navy personnel of World War II
United States Navy reservists